Andrew Byron Bachelor (born June 26, 1988), also known as King Bach is a Canadian-born American Internet personality and actor who rose to fame on the now-defunct video sharing service Vine, where he had 16.2 million followers, making him one of the most followed users on the platform.

Bachelor ventured into acting, first receiving recognition for starring on the Adult Swim series Black Jesus (2014–2015). He rose to mainstream prominence for his roles in the comedy films Meet the Blacks and Fifty Shades of Black (both 2016), the teen romance films When We First Met and To All the Boys I've Loved Before (both 2018), the horror comedy films The Babysitter (2017) and The Babysitter: Killer Queen (2020), and the disaster film Greenland (2020).

Bachelor also has a TikTok account with 27.8 million followers and runs a YouTube channel with over 2.4 million followers.

Early life and education
Bachelor was born in the neighbourhood of Rexdale in Toronto, Ontario to Jamaican parents, accountants Ingrid Mourice and Byron Bachelor. He has one younger sister named Christina. He was two years old when he moved with his family to West Palm Beach, Florida. His strict parents raised him in a Christian household.

He attended Coral Springs Charter School for both middle school and high school. After graduating, Bachelor enrolled at Florida State University, where he competed in the high jump. While a student, he was a member of 30in60, a sketch comedy troupe. He graduated from Florida State University in 2010, with a degree in business management. While at Florida State, Bachelor pledged and became a member/brother of Phi Beta Sigma. Afterwards, he enrolled in a graduate program at the New York Film Academy, but dropped out in his last semester and moved to Los Angeles. He then studied improvisational theatre at The Groundlings.

Career
Bachelor earned 11.3 million followers and over six billion loops on Vine, ranking first on the app for number of followers. He took the title of most-followed person on Vine in March 2015. Though best known for Vine, Bachelor is also known for his YouTube channel, BachelorsPadTv. The channel and its videos have been covered by several online publications, including FSU News. Bachelor has stated that he turned down most requests to upload sponsored Vines.

Bachelor's Vine stardom led to him signing with UTA, and landing a recurring role in House of Lies. In addition, he at one point was a recurring cast member on Wild 'n Out on MTV2. He was also on a series regular on the Adult Swim series Black Jesus, and had a recurring role on The Mindy Project. Bachelor also had a role in the spoof comedy film Fifty Shades of Black, and was a special guest host for the revived version of Punk'd on BET. He appeared as a fictional version of himself in the 2015 film We Are Your Friends.

Bachelor was introduced to Vine by Brittany Furlan, before uploading his first Vine video on April 19, 2013. He starred in several of Bart Baker's parodies of music videos, portraying Big Sean in "Problem" and "Break Free", Pharrell Williams in "Happy", Juicy J in "Dark Horse", and Tupac Shakur in the parody for Sia's "Big Girls Cry".

Bach co-starred in McG's horror film The Babysitter. He reprised his role in the sequel The Babysitter: Killer Queen.

Bach released his debut album, "Medicine", on August 31, 2019. He released two singles from the album. "Say Daddy (song)" was released on February 14, 2019, and "HTH (song)" was released on May 31, 2019.

Bach also has made several songs, including "See Me Now" which he released on February 21, 2021. Bach sent a TikTok telling people to use the sound of a song and that he would duet the best ones. Bach later posted the song onto YouTube, Spotify and SoundCloud.

Filmography

Film

Television

Video games

References

External links
 
 
see me now 

1988 births
American male film actors
American male television actors
American male voice actors
American people of Jamaican descent
American YouTubers
Black Canadian male actors
Canadian emigrants to the United States
Canadian male comedians
Canadian male film actors
Canadian male television actors
Canadian male voice actors
Canadian people of Jamaican descent
Canadian YouTubers
Florida State Seminoles men's track and field athletes
Florida State University alumni
Living people
Male actors from Toronto
Male bloggers
New York Film Academy alumni
People from West Palm Beach, Florida
Shorty Award winners
Video bloggers
Vine (service) celebrities